The 2008 World Senior Curling Championships were held from March 9 to 15 at the Vierumäki Ice Rink in Vierumäki, Finland. Teams from Alberta, Canada won both the men's and women's events.

Men

Round-robin standings

Tiebreaker
 6-5

Playoffs

Women

Round-robin standings

Tiebreaker
 6-5

Playoffs

References

External links
Women's results
Men's results

World Senior Curling Championships
2008 in curling
2008 in Finnish sport
International curling competitions hosted by Finland
Vierumäki
March 2008 sports events in Europe